Shure Incorporated is an American audio products corporation. It was founded by Sidney N. Shure in Chicago, Illinois, in 1925 as a supplier of radio parts kits. The company became a consumer and professional audio-electronics manufacturer of microphones, wireless microphone systems, phonograph cartridges, discussion systems, mixers, and digital signal processing. The company also manufactures listening products, including headphones, high-end earphones, and personal monitor systems.

Company history

Shure was founded by Sidney N. Shure in 1925 as "The Shure Radio Company", selling radio parts kits several
years after completely manufactured radios became commercially available. The company's office was located at 19 South Wells Street in downtown Chicago, Illinois. The following year, Shure published its first direct mail catalog, which was one of only six radio parts catalogs in the United States at the time.  By 1928, the company had grown to over 75 employees, and Sidney's brother, Samuel J. Shure, joined the company, which was renamed Shure Brothers Company. The company moved into new offices at 335 West Madison Street in Chicago. In 1929, with the advent of the Great Depression and the increased availability of factory-built radios, Shure Brothers Company was forced to greatly reduce their staff and became the exclusive US distributor of a small microphone manufacturer. In 1930, Samuel J. Shure left the company.

In 1931, Shure and engineer Ralph Glover began development of the first Shure microphone, and the following year, the Model 33N Two-Button Carbon Microphone was introduced, making Shure one of only four microphone manufacturers in the U.S. Shure's first condenser microphone, crystal microphone, and microphone suspension support system (for which they received their first patent) were all introduced that same decade. In 1939, Shure introduced the Model 55 Unidyne Microphone, which went on to become one of the world's most recognized microphones.

In 1941, Shure was contracted by the United States armed forces to supply microphones during World War II, and by the following year, the T-17B was the microphone most widely used by the U.S. Army and Navy. Shure also manufactured throat, headset, and oxygen mask microphones, and adopted the United States Military Standard for all Shure microphones.

By the mid-1940s, Shure was also manufacturing and supplying phonograph cartridges to major phonograph manufacturers including Philco, RCA, Emerson, Magnavox, Admiral, and Motorola, and was the largest producer of phonograph cartridges in the U.S. at that time. Among Shure's innovations in phonograph cartridge design was Ralph Glover and Ben Bauer's "needle-tilt" principle for minimizing record wear while improving sound reproduction, and Jim Kogen's engineering concept of "trackability." Shure produced the first phonograph cartridge capable of playing both long-playing and 78 rpm records, the first cartridge with tracking force of only one gram, and the first cartridge meeting the requirements of stereo recording. At the peak of Shure's phonograph cartridge production, the company was producing approximately 28,000 cartridges per day, with 25,000 of those coming from a Shure phonograph cartridge plant in Phoenix, Arizona. After the introduction of compact discs in the 1980s reduced the demand for phonograph cartridges, Shure closed the Phoenix facility but continued manufacturing phonograph cartridges in Mexico.  In 2018, Shure announced that they would exit the phonograph cartridge market.

Shure also developed and produced products for medical applications. In 1937, their 66A piezoelectric stethophone was designed to accurately reproduce chest sounds, and in the early 1960s, the SP-5, SP-5S and SP-6 stethoscope pickups were produced. Shure also produced hearing aid cartridges used in hearing aid products from manufacturers like Maico, Telex, Dictograph, Otarian, Vocalite, and Trimm.

In 1956, Shure moved its corporate headquarters to Hartrey Avenue in Evanston, Illinois, where it remained for 47 years. Beginning in 1956, Shure manufactured magnetic tape recording heads and two years later, the company announced it was ready to mass-produce 4-ch recording heads. By 1964, however, Shure announced it would no longer produce tape recording heads due to increased competition.

In 1953, Shure introduced their first wireless microphone system for performers, and in 1959, they introduced the Unidyne III Microphone, which was the predecessor to the SM57, which would be introduced, along with the SM58, six years later. Shure also produced portable equipment for broadcast field recording like Vocal Master, the M67 Portable Mixer, and the FP31 Portable Mixer. In 1990, Shure entered the wireless microphone market with the L-Series.

In 1981, James Kogen, Executive Vice President, Operations, was promoted to President and General Manager of Shure. In 1995, Sidney N. Shure died at the age of 93, and Rose L. Shure was elected Chairman of the Board of Directors. In 1996, James Kogen retired; Santo (Sandy) LaMantia, Vice President of Engineering, was named President and CEO. Shure Brothers Incorporated was officially renamed Shure Incorporated in 1999. Rose Shure died in 2016 at the age of 95

In 2001, Shure acquired the Popper Stopper brand of studio pop filters from Middle Atlantic Products Inc. In 2002 Shure adopted hearing conservation as the company's corporate cause, and established the Shure Bid for Hearing program. In 2003, Shure moved to new headquarters in Niles, Illinois, in a building designed by architect Helmut Jahn that was originally the headquarters of HA•LO Industries. The  Technology Annex designed by Krueck and Sexton Architects, opened in 2005, houses Shure's Performance Listening Center. In 2008, Shure celebrated the opening of The S.N. Shure Theater and Interactive Display at their corporate headquarters. In 2016, Sandy LaMantia announced his retirement and Christine Schyvinck, Vice President of Global Operations, Marketing, and Sales and Chief Operating Officer, was promoted to president and CEO.

In October 2020, Shure acquired Midas Technology, Inc., also known as Stem Audio, which specializes in table, ceiling and wall microphones as well as loudspeakers, control interfaces and hubs.

International offices
1991: Shure Europe GmbH opened in Heilbronn, Germany, to provide sales, service and support to Shure distribution centers in 34 European countries.
1999: Shure Asia Limited is opened in Hong Kong to serve Distribution Centers and distributors throughout Asia and the Pacific Rim.
2002: Shure Distribution GmbH established as a subsidiary of Shure Europe GmbH, to handle direct sales with Shure dealers in Germany.
2003: HW International, Shure's United Kingdom Distribution Center, acquired and renamed Shure Distribution UK.
2005: Sales and marketing office opened in Shanghai, China.
2006: Sales and marketing office opened in Tokyo, Japan.
2010: New subsidiary formed in the Netherlands
2011: Office for product development in Copenhagen, Denmark.
2014: Sales and marketing office for Middle East & Africa opened in Dubai, U.A.E.
2018: Shure Distribution GmbH Begins Direct Distribution of System and Consumer Retail Products in Austria
2018: Shure Distribution Switzerland GmbH starts direct operations

Production facility expansion
1982: Manufacturing facility opened in Wheeling, Illinois
1983: Phonograph cartridge manufacturing facility opened in Agua Prieta, Mexico
1984: Wired microphone manufacturing facility opened in Juarez, Mexico
1989: Juarez, Mexico facility expanded
1994: Agua Prieta facility expanded in 1994
2005: Manufacturing facility opened in Suzhou, China

Products

Wired microphones

Shure first began manufacturing their own products in 1932 with the introduction of the 33N two-button carbon microphone. The Model 40D, Shure's first condenser microphone, was introduced the next year, and the first of a line of crystal microphone, the Model 70, was introduced in 1935. With the introduction of the 55 Unidyne microphone in 1939, the company's offerings included carbon, condenser, crystal, and dynamic microphones. Wired and wireless microphones together represent the largest category of Shure's overall business. Shure currently produces numerous series of microphones for various applications, including the SM, Beta, KSM, and PG series, as well as specialty consumer microphones, Microflex, and Easyflex (conferencing systems for commercially installed applications).

One of Shure's most visually iconic microphone series is the Unidyne series, seen in use by heads of state and popular recording artists and performers from the 1940s through the end of the twentieth century, including President John F. Kennedy, Ella Fitzgerald, and Frank Sinatra. The Model 55 Unidyne is pictured with Harry S. Truman in the photograph where he is holding the Chicago Tribune newspaper with the erroneous front-page headline "Dewey Defeats Truman". It is also pictured in front of Fidel Castro on the cover of the January 19, 1959, issue of Life magazine and in front of Martin Luther King Jr. as he delivered his "I Have a Dream" speech during the August 1963 March on Washington for Jobs and Freedom. The original Shure 55 Unidyne microphone was designed by engineer Ben Bauer and first produced in 1939. Shure designed the 55 Unidyne as a rugged public address microphone with good audio performance. It was notable for its single-element, unidirectional design, which was smaller, less susceptible to feedback, and less sensitive to ambient noise than other microphones of the time. Several variants of the original Unidyne have been produced, most notably the 55S or "Baby Unidyne". The 55S is sometimes referred to as the "Elvis mic" due to its frequent use by Elvis Presley, and is the microphone depicted with Elvis on the commemorative first-class Elvis stamp issued by the U.S. Postal Service in 1993. In 2008, the Unidyne Model 55 microphone was inducted into the TECnology Hall of Fame, and the following year, Shure released the 55SH Series II. A supercardioid version, the Super 55 Deluxe Vocal Microphone, was introduced in 2009, featuring high gain before feedback and excellent off-axis rejection and further extending Unidyne's 70-plus year legacy. The 55 Series microphones were given the "IEEE Milestone" award in 2014.

With the U.S. Army's approval of the Shure T-17 microphone for use during World War II, Shure began producing what would be several specialized microphones for U.S. military use during that war. Shure's adoption of the Military Standard Specification, and product redesigns intended to conserve raw materials essential to the war effort, positioned the company to fulfill the military's needs for specialized microphones. The T-17 Battle Announce Microphone was the most widely used microphone in the U.S. Army and Air Force during World War II, and featured a plastic case that conserved aluminum and lighter and more reliable in a wide range of temperatures and climates. A waterproof version was used on nearly all U.S. Navy ships. Shure also designed the T-30 Throat Microphone for flight crews. A cloth strap held the T-30 against the throat, capturing the user's voice box vibrations directly and avoiding the background noise of the airplane. Shure also manufactured specialized headsets and the MC-1 oxygen mask microphone. In yet another example of the widespread use of Shure microphones by the U.S. military, U.S. lookout Private Lockhard used a Shure 700A microphone to announce his sighting of Japanese planes approaching Pearl Harbor on the morning of On December 7, 1941.

The Shure SM series of microphones began with the introduction of the SM57 in 1965 and the SM58 in 1966. The SM (Studio Microphone) series microphones were originally developed with a non-reflective finish and no on-off switch for the TV studio market. The SM57 is well known for its durability and the versatile sound characteristics, much attributable to the Ernie Seeler-designed Unidyne III capsule. Produced since 1965 and still in production today, it has been widely used in many applications, including micing vocals, drums, and guitar amplifiers both in live sound and recording applications, including being used by every United States President from Lyndon Baines Johnson on. The SM57 was inducted into the TECnology Hall Of Fame in 2004. Together, the Shure SM57 and SM58 have been the two bestselling microphones in the world since the late 1960s. Their feature set is nearly identical, with the main difference between the two being their different grilles. Shure later expanded the SM series, which now include such models as the now hard to find SM53 & SM54 (which were low proximity effect microphones), SM45, SM48, SM56, SM57, SM58, SM85, SM86, SM87A, SM94, and the SM81 which is a longtime recording studio standard.

Shure introduced Beta Series microphones in 1989. These feature a supercardioid designs based on SM series microphones, but with neodymium magnet structures for higher output. The series also included two new microphones specifically for drums, the Beta 56 drum microphone and the Beta 52 kick drum microphone, later updated to the Beta 52A. The Beta 58A microphone was awarded a TEC award in 1996, and several other Beta series microphones have been nominated for TEC awards over the years.

Shure's first headset microphone for stage use was created in 1991.  One of the earliest uses of a Shure headset mic onstage was for the television special Medusa: Dare to be Truthful.  Among the headset microphones Shure has manufactured over the years are the WH20, WH30, WCM16 (introduced in 1993), Beta53 and Beta54. The newest of Shure's headset microphones, the MX153, part of the Microflex series, was introduced in 2012.

In 1999, Shure introduced the first mic in their KSM Series of premium recording microphones, the KSM32. KSM series microphones feature Class A discrete transformer-less preamplifiers. Ten years later in 2009, Shure acquired Crowley and Tripp Ribbon Microphones from Soundwave Research Laboratories of Ashland, Massachusetts, along with the company's proprietary "Roswellite" ribbon material, and added both ribbon microphones, now rebranded the KSM353 and KSM313, to the KSM series.

Shure brought out the SM5 microphone in 1966, intended for broadcasting applications. In 1973, the SM5 was updated and reduced in size to become the SM7, which was widely adopted by television and radio announcers, but occasionally used in recording studios to pick up vocals, horns, guitars or bass drums. Both the SM5 and SM7 were built on the SM57-type Unidyne III element as the core transducer, tailored for lower frequency response. Engineer-producer Bruce Swedien used the SM7 to record Michael Jackson's vocals for Thriller. In 1999 the SM7A model appeared with beefed-up shielding against electromagnetic interference (for instance from television CRTs), and in 2001 the SM7B model added a larger windscreen. In 2001–2003, the SM7 was used to record heavy metal vocalist James Hetfield for the Metallica album St. Anger, as seen in the documentary Metallica: Some Kind of Monster. The SM7B was radically redesigned in 2020, reduced in size and provided with active digital audio circuitry to become the MV7, with both XLR and USB connections. The MV7 swiftly picked up a large share of the podcasting market, and was named the best podcast microphone by Rolling Stone magazine in 2021.

Phonograph cartridges
Shure began supplying replacement crystal pickups to various manufacturers in 1933 and by the mid-1940s Shure was the largest supplier of phonograph cartridges in America, supplying record manufacturers like Philco, RCA, Emerson, Magnavox, Admiral, and Motorola. At the peak of Shure's production the company was producing more than 28,000 cartridges per day, with 25,000 produced at Shure's Phoenix plant. While Shure continues to manufacture phono cartridges, the Phoenix facility was closed in the late 1980s due to declining demand.

Shure engineers introduced several key phono cartridge design concepts. Chief engineer Ralph Glover discussed the pickup design relationship to record wear in a 1937 article in Electronics magazine entitled "A Record-Saving Pickup". Glover developed the "needle-tilt" principle with the assistance of fellow Shure engineer Ben Bauer, and considerations of needle angle, record wear, and fidelity were an integral part of Shure's cartridge designs. In 1966, chief engineer Jim Kogen published a research paper entitled "TRACKability" in Audio magazine, defining the concept as the ability of a cartridge to maintain contact with a record groove through any modulation.

Shure is credited with several industry firsts. In 1948, the company introduced the 900MG, the first phonograph cartridge capable of playing both long-playing and 78 rpm records, and in 1954, Shure's M12 Dynetic Phono Reproducer tonearm and cartridge set established an industry standard with a tracking force of only one gram. The M1 Studio Dynetic Cartridge introduced the principle of a moving magnet within a stationary coil, an engineering concept that dominated cartridge design for nearly 25 years due to its higher output, lower noise, and greater headroom. The Shure M3D, introduced in 1958, was the first ever stereo moving magnet cartridge, with 20 dB of stereo separation at 20 kHz.

Shure has also designed and manufactured cartridges specifically for disc jockeys. Their M35X and Whitelabel cartridges are designed for nightclubs. The M44-7, however, is designed for scratching, which involves playing a vinyl record forward and backward rhythmically. The M44-7 cartridge is renowned for its tracking and skip resistance, which has made it a popular choice of turntablists such as The Invisibl Skratch Piklz.

Shure's flagship V15 phonograph cartridge series, with the model name referring to their 15-degree tracking angle, was established for decades as the premier cartridge for low tracking force and high tracking ability. The V-15 series also included several industry firsts: the original V-15 model (introduced in 1964) was the first to feature "trackability", and utilized a symmetrical, bi-radial elliptical stylus. The V-15 Type II (introduced in 1966) was the first computer-designed phono cartridge and the first to feature a flip-action built-in stylus guard. The V-15 Type IV (introduced in 1978) was the first to feature the dynamic stabilizer, which discharged static electricity from the groove and stabilized the cartridge for playback of warped records. The V-15 Type V marked the introduction of a proprietary "ultra-thin wall beryllium" stylus shank with a stiffness-to-mass ratio several times that of other cartridges on the market. In 1998, Sony Music Entertainment selected the Shure V15VxMR to transcribe 80 years of Columbia Records and Sony Music masters and recordings. In 2008, the British Gramophone magazine awarded the V-15 an "Audio Choice" designation for outstanding performance and value. Due to the scarcity of the raw materials required to manufacture V-15 cartridges, Shure discontinued the series in 2004, and in June 2009, the last remaining V-15 stock was purchased by the Library of Congress. On May 1, 2018, Shure publicly announced that they would be ceasing production of all phono products, effective Summer 2018.

Sound reinforcement systems

Shure introduced the Vocal Master sound reinforcement system, touted as "the first portable total sound system", at the 1968 winter NAMM Show. The Vocal Master system consisted of a combination of control consoles, speakers, amplifiers, mixers, and microphones. Multiple components and systems could be combined to expand the Vocal Master system to larger sound reinforcement applications. The Vocal Master was at one time the official on-tour sound system for performing acts such as the 5th Dimension and The Carpenters among others. Vocal Master was also utilized for installed sound applications in educational institutions and churches, as well as at the Rockefeller Center's Rainbow Room where it was used for performances by such artists as Benny Goodman and Duke Ellington, and at the London Palladium.

Mixers and DSP

In 1966, Shure introduced the M68, a portable mixer capable of being battery powered along with available accessories like a carry case and battery power supply specifically designed to address the needs of broadcast journalists and field recording personnel. The following year, the Shure M67 mixer added an illuminated VU meter and a line level output transformer for connecting the mixer to a telephone line. In August 1969, Eddie Kramer recorded the 4-day Woodstock Festival using three Shure M67 mixers. Shure's portable mixer line later included other models such as the M267 and 268.

Shure introduced the FP31 mixer in 1983. The FP31 was smaller and lighter than similar products of the time—small enough to hold in the palm of the hand and weighing just 2.2 pounds. This positioned it to complement the one-piece Sony Betacam video camera, which had been widely adopted by remote video broadcast crews. The FP31 could operate up to eight hours on two standard 9-volt batteries, and included two separate microphone/line outputs for two-camera video shoots. Its master section featured an adjustable threshold limiter to prevent overload distortion, and there was a separate microphone/line switch with low-cut filter on each channel. By 1984, just a year after its introduction, the FP31 was being used by ABC, CBS, NBC, Turner Broadcasting System, and was later succeeded by the Shure FP33.

In addition, Shure introduced other portable products useful to broadcast remote and field recording, such as FP11 Microphone-To-Line Level amplifier, the FP12 Headphone Bridging amplifier, and the FP22 Headphone amplifier.

In 1991, Shure introduced the FP410 automatic mixer, featuring Shure's patented IntelliMix circuitry, which automatically activates special double-element microphones based on the direction of a talker's signal. That same year, the FP410 was recognized with the Technical Achievement Award from the International Television Association for "significantly advancing the state of the art in the field of non-network television." Shure later introduced the SCM810, an 8-in, 1-out automatic microphone mixer that also featured Shure IntelliMix circuitry.

Shure also introduced digital signal processing products for this market, beginning with the DFR11EQ digital feedback reducer (introduced in 1996) and the DFR22 2-in, 2-out feedback reduction audio processor.

Conference

Shure introduced the Automatic Microphone System (AMS) in 1983, one of the first automatic, high-quality mixer system using directional gating for installations utilizing multiple microphones. In 1987, Shure SCM810 Automatic Mixer installations begin at the United States Capitol, and by 1997, the US Capitol was one of the largest Shure automatic mixer installations in the world. In 2008, Shure introduced the Microflex microphone line specifically designed for conference room applications.

Wireless microphone systems
Shure manufactures several lines of wireless microphone systems, many of them utilizing microphone capsules from their wired microphones models such as the SM58, SM87, Beta 58, and Beta87A. The systems range in scope from entry-level to high-end systems used for touring and large-scale event applications.

In the early 1950s, Shure introduced the Vagabond 88 wireless microphone system. Operating within a copper wire circle either suspended from the ceiling or laid on the floor, the system could transmit within an area of approximately 700 square feet. The system consisted of a low-frequency FM radio transmitter and microphone, utilized five subminiature vacuum tubes, and was powered by two hearing aid batteries. The Vagabond system was expensive and somewhat fragile, but was adopted for use by several Las Vegas venues of the time. Not until 1990 did Shure re-enter the wireless microphone market with the introduction of the L Series.

Even before Shure re-entered the wireless microphone market though, concert engineers commonly specified Shure microphone capsules for the wireless microphone systems they were using. Once Shure introduced its own UHF wireless microphone system, which featured wireless versions of several popular Shure microphones, they no longer made capsules available for other manufacturers' systems. This practice encouraged sales of Shure wireless systems and gained Shure market share in the category. Shure's UHF system featured software control and the ability to operate as many as 78 systems simultaneously. On the ULX series (introduced in 2002), they featured the ability to scan for clear wireless channels, sound quality rivaling wired models, a less expensive package, and the ability to operate 40 systems simultaneously. The ULX system was awarded a TEC Award in 2002.

In 2005, Shure introduced the SLX series of wireless microphone systems. It featured their patented "audio reference companding", a level-dependent companding protocol that does not compand low-level audio where the wireless artifacts would be more audible. "Audio reference companding" was said to help a wireless system sound more like a wired microphone due to clearer sound, a lower noise floor, and greater dynamic range. In 2005, the SLX series was awarded a TEC Award. The following year, The UHF-R series was introduced with audio reference companding as a main feature and "wireless workbench" software for computer coordination and control of frequency selection, customized settings, and synchronization of multi-system components. The UHF-R series received a TEC award in 2006.

In 2011, they introduced their first digital wireless system, the PGX digital series, augmenting the released previously entry-priced PGX series. The PGX digital wireless system transmits 24-bit/48 kHz digital audio and utilizes the 900 MHz frequency band, and is able to operate with up to five systems simultaneously. Like all Shure wireless, it is available with a variety of popular Shure microphone models, or in bodypack configurations for use with lavalier or headset microphones, or connected to an instrument cable.

In 2011, Shure previewed Axient, a wireless management network, which includes features for spectrum management, interference detection and avoidance, frequency diversity, remote control (including remote configuration of wireless units via the 2.4 GHz "Zigbee" WPAN IEEE 802.15.4 based "Showlink" protocol) and the use of Li-ion rechargeable batteries to eliminate the use of ordinary AA and AAA batteries.

Shure also previewed "Wireless Workbench" software in conjunction with Axient.  This was a desktop application for Mac and Windows designed to monitor and control networked Shure wireless systems, as well as provide tools to coordinate and deploy compatible frequencies.  Since its initial release, the application has received numerous updates, and is now available to download for free from Shure's website.

They started shipping Axient in January 2012 and it has been used in venues and events such as the 2012 Summer Olympics and Paralympics Opening and Closing Ceremonies in London.

In 2013, Shure introduced the BLX wireless system to replace the Performance Gear and PGX wireless systems) and the GLX-D wireless system, which operates in the 2.4 GHz frequency band.

Personal monitors
Shure entered the personal monitoring system category in 1997 with the introduction of the PSM 600. In-ear personal monitoring systems enable a performer or public speaker to monitor audio separately from the amplified sound for the audience. Prior to in-ear monitoring, this was usually accomplished by monitor speakers placed on the stage and oriented toward the performer or speaker and away from the audience, and usually with its own separate "monitor mix" of audio. An in-ear monitor system isolates the monitor mix without the interference of other background sounds, and reduces the risk of other complications like feedback.

In 2000, the Shure PSM 400 Personal Stereo Monitor system was awarded a TEC Award. Shure introduced the PSM 900 Personal Monitor System at the 2010 Winter NAMM Show.

Earphones

Shure also offers in-ear monitor-styled earphones as a part of a personal monitor system package or as an independent purchase, as these earphones are also suitable for music listening on portable audio devices such as MP3 players.

Headphones
Shure started offering around-ear headphones in May 2009, and since then expanded their lineup to cater to different listening needs, from basic listening to audiophile-demanding listening.

In October 2014, Shure began to offer on-ear, portable headphones in semi-open back and closed back designs. The closed back model is optionally available with an inline microphone and remote to control iOS devices, creating offerings in each of three segments of "Portable", "Studio/Professional", and "Premium/Audiophile" models.

Awards

1943-1946: Army-Navy "E" Award and 3 "E" Stars for excellence in production awarded to Shure
1990: FP410 recognized with the Technical Achievement Award from the International Television Association for "significantly advancing the state of the art in the field of non-network television."
2003: Shure Incorporated awarded the National Academy of the Recording Arts and Sciences Technical GRAMMY, awarded to individuals and/or companies that have made outstanding contributions of technical significance to the recording industry
2004: Shure SM57 microphone inducted to the TECnology Hall of Fame
2006: Shure was named one of “Chicago’s 101 Best and Brightest Companies to Work For.”
2007: Shure SE530 awarded iLounge Best of 2007/Deluxe Earphone of the Year
2007: Shure SE530 awarded Windows Vista magazine Editor's Choice Award
2007: Shure SE530 awarded PC World magazine “100 Best Products of 2007”
2008: Shure Unidyne Model 55 microphone inducted to the TECnology Hall of Fame
2014 IEEE Milestone Award Winner. Unidyne Microphone. World's first unidirectional, single element, dynamic microphone.

TEC Awards and nominations
Shure was nominated for (and won) other TEC Awards:
1991 
VP88 Stereo MS microphone
1994 
Beta87 microphone
1996 
Beta58A microphone (Winner)
1999 
KSM32 microphone
PSM 600 Personal Monitors
2000 
PSM700 Personal Stereo Monitor
2001 
PSM400 Personal Monitors (Winner)
FP24 small format mixer
KSM44 microphone
2002 
Beta 98H/C microphone
ULX Series Wireless (Winner)
Auxpander sound reinforcement mixer
2003 
SM86 microphone (Winner)
2004 TECnology Hall of Fame 
SM57 microphone
2005 
SLX Series Wireless (Winner)
2006 
E4c Earphones (Winner)
UHF-R Wireless Microphone System (Winner)
2007 
KSM9 microphone
2009 
URI-M Micro Bodypack
2010 
SRH840 pro monitoring headphones
PSM900 Personal Monitor System
Beta 27 microphone
2012 
Beta 181 microphone
PGX-D Digital Wireless System
2013 
AXIENT Wireless Systems
2015 
GLXD6 Guitar Pedal Receiver with Tuner
2017
KSM8 Dualdyne Dynamic Microphone (winner)
KSE1500 Electrostatic Earphone System

See also

List of microphone manufacturers

References

External links

Retro Perspectives - Historical information about the Shure 55SH II microphone
Rose Shure NAMM Oral History Interview (2005)
Sandy La Mantia NAMM Oral History Interview (2005)
William Bevan NAMM Oral History Interview (2005)
Michael Pettersen NAMM Oral History Interview (2005)
Tim Vear NAMM Oral History Interview (2013)
Kevin Wilson NAMM Oral History Interview (2009)
Sound for Video Session — History of the SHURE SM7 with Michael Pettersen

Audio equipment manufacturers of the United States
Microphone manufacturers
Consumer electronics brands
Companies based in Cook County, Illinois
Electronics companies established in 1925
Headphones manufacturers
Niles, Illinois
1925 establishments in Illinois
Audio mixing console manufacturers
DJ equipment
American brands